Baj Maan (born 12 July 2000) is a Canadian professional soccer player who plays as a goalkeeper.

Early life
Maan grew up in Brampton, Ontario. He played youth soccer with Mississauga-based club Sigma FC, making his senior debut in League1 Ontario in 2016. The following year, he made two appearances, but failed to make an appearance in 2018. His breakout year for Sigma came in 2019, when he made seven appearances.

Club career
On 11 June 2019, Maan signed a developmental contract with Canadian Premier League side Forge FC, managed by former Sigma FC coach Bobby Smyrniotis. As the third-string keeper behind Triston Henry and Quillan Roberts, he failed to make an appearance that year. That fall, he attended Northern Kentucky University, where he started in seventeen matches. On 31 July 2020, Maan re-signed with Forge FC ahead of the delayed 2020 season. He made his professional debut on 5 September in a 2–2 draw against Valour FC. Maan re-signed with Forge FC for the 2022 season and served as an unused substitute for the club's CONCACAF Champions League matches against Cruz Azul. However, during the club's first match of the CPL season, OneSoccer broadcaster Adam Jenkins announced that Maan had left the club and was trialling at Toronto FC II.

Maan's trial was ultimately successful as he signed an MLS Next Pro contract with Toronto FC II on 7 May, 2022.

After leaving the club at the end of the season, in February 2023 Maan went on trial with Canadian Premier League side Pacific FC during their pre-season camp.

Career statistics

Honours

Club
Forge FC
 Canadian Premier League: 2020

References

External links

2000 births
Living people
Association football goalkeepers
Canadian soccer players
Canadian expatriate soccer players
Expatriate soccer players in the United States
Canadian expatriate sportspeople in the United States
Northern Kentucky Norse men's soccer players
Forge FC players
League1 Ontario players
Canadian Premier League players
Sigma FC players
Soccer players from Brampton
Toronto FC II players